"I've Found Someone of My Own" is a song written by Frank F. Robinson and performed by The Free Movement. It was produced by Joe Porter, arranged by Jimmie Haskell and Michael Omartian, and was featured on the band's 1972 album, I've Found Someone of My Own.

It reached #5 on the Billboard Hot 100, #7 on the US adult contemporary chart, and #20 on the US R&B chart in 1971.  

The single ranked #27 on the Billboard Year-End Hot 100 singles of 1971.

Chart history

Weekly charts

Year-end charts

Other charting versions
Cal Smith, as a single in 1972, which reached #4 on the US country chart and #13 on the Canadian country chart.

Other versions
Ray Conniff and The Singers, on their 1971 album, I'd Like to Teach the World to Sing.
Frankie Ford, as the B-side to his 1976 single "Battle Hymn of the Republic".  It was featured on his 1976 album, Frankie Ford.
Mel Street, on his 1972 album, Borrowed Angel.

References

External links
 
 

1971 songs
1971 singles
1972 singles
The Free Movement songs
Cal Smith songs
Decca Records singles
Songs about infidelity